Selena Coppa (born February 25, 1983) is an ex-military intelligence Sergeant in the United States Army. She is primarily notable for her organizing and activism against the US Occupation of Iraq while serving as an active duty military member, including serving on the Executive Board of Iraq Veterans Against the War. In 2009 it was announced that she was heading a committee responsible for gaining and training more active duty anti-war soldiers. She has the somewhat unusual status of being a war resister strictly holding to legalities, and has been identified as a primary "force multiplier" for other servicemembers attempting to resist the war through legal means.

Military service

Coppa enlisted in the Army in 2000 under the Delayed Entry Program and began her service as a Military Intelligence soldier in February 2001. Much of her work during the war was classified, and she has generally refused to speak about those matters, citing legal restrictions.

Protest activities
In February 2007, Coppa became active with Iraq Veterans Against the War (IVAW), though she did not come to prominence until January 2008, when she took over the GI Outreach Team for IVAW. She began coordinating the active duty wing of IVAW, flying and driving around the country, and visiting military bases to speak, distribute information, and organize other soldiers. She rose to international media attention in March 2008, when she testified at the Winter Soldier: Iraq & Afghanistan hearings in Silver Spring, Maryland. One of only two active duty participants, she chaired the Breakdown of the Military panel. Shortly after testifying, she was reassigned to Germany but still made regular appearances inside the US, including at the Winter Soldier on the Hill hearings before Congress in May 2008  and on the State of the Union Base Tour. She was a main organizer of the DNC and RNC protests. In early 2009, she was named to the IVAW Board of Directors, and was subsequently elected to the Executive Board. She later resigned from this position, whistleblowing and citing ethical concerns about another executive board member. She was removed from the board after refusing to recant the charges.

Military repercussions
Coppa reported suffering informal harassment by her unit and was also investigated by CID with no charges filed shortly after Winter Soldier. Shortly after being named to the Board of Directors, she was also placed under investigation and threatened with court-martial and potential discharge for her blogging and other activities. Coppa was represented by military law expert Michael Lebowitz, who successfully defended her against charges of disloyal statements and dereliction of duty. Coppa later received company-grade nonjudicial punishment for appearing in uniform at a protest march during participation at an IVAW-led march two years prior.

Print and film

Coppa was a main character in the documentary filmseries "This Is Where We Take Our Stand", appearing in several episodes and the introductory and closing sequences.
Coppa has also been an active blogger on both her own blog called "Active Duty Patriot" and the nonpartisan blog "Military Pundits".

References

1983 births
Living people
American anti–Iraq War activists
United States Army soldiers
Women in the United States Army
American women bloggers
American bloggers
21st-century American women writers